Pancho Barnes is a 1988 American made-for-television biographical film about the pioneering female aviator, starring Valerie Bertinelli, Ted Wass, James Stephens and Cynthia Harris. The film was directed by Richard T. Heffron and premiered on CBS on October 25, 1988.

Plot
Leaving an arranged marriage to Reverend Rankin Barnes (James Stephens), Florence Lowe "Pancho" Barnes (Bertinelli) takes an interest in flying light planes in the 1920s, and soon rivals Amelia Earhart (Nance Williamson), breaking world speed records.

Barnes is hired by Howard Hughes (David Kockinis) to do stunt flying for the film Hell's Angels, instigates the formation of the Associated Motion Picture Pilots, was a World War II Air Force Civilian Pilot Trainer, and establishes the Happy Bottom Riding Club as a mess hall for pilots and former servicemen.

Cast
Valerie Bertinelli as Pancho Barnes
Ted Wass as Frank Clarke
James Stephens as Rankin Barnes
Cynthia Harris as Mrs. Lowe
Geoffrey Lewis as Ben Catlin
Todd Allen as Chuck Yeager

Reception
Don Shirley of the Los Angeles Times was critical, saying the film sanitized Barnes' life and persona.

Awards
At the 1989 Emmys, Pancho Barnes won Outstanding Achievement in Costuming for A Miniseries or A Special and was nominated for Outstanding Achievement in Music Composition for A Miniseries or A Special.

See also
 The Legend of Pancho Barnes and the Happy Bottom Riding Club, 2009 documentary

References

External links

1988 television films
1988 films
1980s biographical drama films
1980s adventure drama films
American adventure drama films
American biographical drama films
American aviation films
Films set in Texas
Films set in the 1920s
Films about aviators
Biographical television films
CBS network films
Films directed by Richard T. Heffron
Films with screenplays by John Michael Hayes
Orion Pictures films
American drama television films
1980s American films
1980s English-language films